The Učka ([]) is a mountain range in western Croatia. It rises behind the Opatija riviera, on the eastern side of the Istrian peninsula.

It forms a single morphological unit together with the Ćićarija range which stretches from the Bay of Trieste to Rijeka. Učka is a limestone massif with numerous areas of karst, stretching for 20 km from the Poklon Pass (920 m) to Plomin Bay, and is between 4 and 9 km wide.

It differs from all the other coastal mountains in Croatia because of its abundant vegetation on the seaward side. Best known are the forests of sweet chestnuts in the area around Lovran.

Učka's highest peaks are considered nature reserves and memorial areas. The highest peak, Vojak, is located at 1396 meters above sea level. From it there are views over Istria, the Bay of Trieste, the Julian Alps and the Adriatic islands, right down to Dugi Otok.

The subject of a degree of local folklore, Učka is visible from much of the peninsula and is snow-capped some months of the year.  The town of Opatija is said to have derived its popularity as a resort in Imperial Austria because it is located "in the shade" of Mt. Učka, which by legend shields it from the fierce Mediterranean heat in summertime.

The area of Učka is designated a nature park (park prirode), a kind of protected area in Croatia.

Historically, the Istro-Romanians, a Romance ethnic group of Istria, have been separated by the mountain range, forming two areas of concentration: one in the village of Žejane and one in the village of Šušnjevica and the surrounding settlements. Although these areas are 50 kilometers away from each other, there is a road around the Učka that connects them.

See also 
 Učka Tunnel

References

External links 

 Učka Nature Park
 Land Art Trail on Mt. Učka

Mountain ranges of Croatia
Nature parks of Croatia
Istria
Landforms of Istria County